Gjuro Szabo (sometimes also Đuro Szabo; February 3, 1875 in Novska – May 2, 1943 in Zagreb) was a Croatian historian, art conserver and museologist. He published over 200 papers about Croatian national history, the history of art, art conservation, museology and toponomastics, such as Medieval cities of Croatia and Slavonia, Through the Croatian Hinterland and Old Zagreb. From 1911 to 1943, he was the secretary of the State Committee for Landmark Preservation in Croatia and Slavonia, and from 1929 the manager of the Zagreb City Museum.

Work 
 "Medieval Towns in Croatia and Slavonia", Zagreb, 1920
 "Contributions to the Building History of Zagreb Cathedral" (Prilozi za građevnu povijest zagrebačke katedrale), Zagreb, 1929
 "From the Olden Days of Zagreb" (Iz starih dana Zagreba), Zagreb, 1929 (vol. I), 1930 (vol. II), 1933 (vol. III)
 "The Art of Our Countryside Churches" (Umjetnost u našim ladanjskim crkvama), Zagreb, 1930
 "Through the Hrvatsko Zagorje (Croatian Hinterland)", (Kroz Hrvatsko zagorje), Zagreb, 1939
 "Old Zagreb", (Stari Zagreb), Zagreb, 1941

Sources
 

1875 births
1943 deaths
People from Novska
20th-century Croatian historians
Burials at Mirogoj Cemetery
Conservator-restorers